The men's horizontal bar competition was one of eight events for male competitors in artistic gymnastics at the 1968 Summer Olympics in Mexico City. The event was held on 22, 24, and 26 October. There were 115 competitors from 27 nations, with nations in the team competition having up to 6 gymnasts and other nations entering up to 3 gymnasts. The event was won in a tie between Akinori Nakayama of Japan (the nation's third victory in the horizontal bar in four Games, tying Switzerland for most all-time) and Mikhail Voronin of the Soviet Union (the nation's second consecutive gold medal in the event, tying the United States for third-most all-time). Eizo Kenmotsu of Japan took bronze.

Background

This was the 12th appearance of the event, which is one of the five apparatus events held every time there were apparatus events at the Summer Olympics (no apparatus events were held in 1900, 1908, 1912, or 1920). Three of the six finalists from 1964 returned: bronze medalist Miroslav Cerar of Yugoslavia, fourth-place finisher Victor Lisitsky of the Soviet Union, and fifth-place finisher Yukio Endo of Japan. Cerar and Endo had both been finalists in 1960 as well. Japan had swept the medals at the 1966 world championships, with Akinori Nakayama winning, Endo taking second, and Takashi Mitsukuri third. Cerar had tied with Mikhail Voronin of the Soviet Union for fourth.

Ecuador and the Philippines each made their debut in the men's horizontal bar; East and West Germany competed separately for the first time. The United States made its 11th appearance, most of any nation, having missed only the inaugural 1896 Games.

Competition format

Each nation entered a team of six gymnasts or up to three individual gymnasts. All entrants in the gymnastics competitions performed both a compulsory exercise and a voluntary exercise for each apparatus. The scores for all 12 exercises were summed to give an individual all-around score. (Two gymnasts who entered the all-around competition did not perform on the horizontal bar.)

These exercise scores were also used for qualification for the new apparatus finals. The two exercises (compulsory and voluntary) for each apparatus were summed to give an apparatus score; the top 6 in each apparatus participated in the finals; others were ranked 7th through 115th. In the final, each gymnast performed an additional voluntary exercise; half of the score from the preliminary carried over.

Schedule

All times are Central Standard Time (UTC-6)

Results

References

Official Olympic Report
www.gymnasticsresults.com
www.gymn-forum.net

Men's Horizontal Bar
Men's 1968
Men's events at the 1968 Summer Olympics